Jane Gross (September 10, 1947 – November 9, 2022) was an American sportswriter. She wrote for Newsday and The New York Times. She was the first woman known to have entered a professional basketball locker room. In February 1975, as a reporter for Newsday she asked New York Knicks coach Red Holzman to enter the locker room at Madison Square Garden, to which he agreed.

In 2011 Gross authored the book Bittersweet Season: Caring for Our Aging Parents – and Ourselves.

In 2018 she was given an award by the Association for Women in Sports Media.

References

External links

1947 births
2022 deaths
American writers